Muhammad Shah (1702–1748) was Mughal emperor from 1719 to 1748.

Muhammad Shah or Mohammad Shah may also refer to:

People 
 Muhammad Shah Yusaf Gardezi, Islamic saint who restored Multan, Pakistan
 Muhammad-Shah ibn Bahram-Shah, last Seljuq amir of Kerman (Persia), 1183–1186
 Muhammad Shah of Kedah, 3rd sultan of Kedah (Malay Peninsula), 1201–1236
 Mohammed Shah I, 2nd ruler of the Bahmani Sultanate (India), 1358–1377
 Muhammad Shah of Brunei (died 1402), first sultan of Brunei (Borneo), 1368–1402
 Muhammad Shah I, Gujarat Sultanate, India, 1403–1404
 Muhammad Shah Mir fifteenth-century Sultan of Kashmir.
 Muhammad Shah of Malacca, 3rd sultan of Malacca (Malay Peninsula), 1424–1444
 Muhammad Shah (Sayyid dynasty), Delhi Sultanate, 1434–1445
 Muhammad Shah II, Muzaffarid Sultan of Gujarat 1442–1451
 Muhammad Shah, ruler of the Jaunpur Sultanate (India), 1457–1458
 Muhammad Shah or Ba Saw Nyo (1435–1494), king of Arakan (Burma), 1492–1494
 Muhammad Shah of Pahang (1450–1475), first sultan of Pahang (Malay Peninsula), 1470–1475
 Muhammad Shah Adil, 4th ruler of the Sur dynasty (Afghan India), 1554–1555
 Mohammad Shah Qajar (1808–1848), king of Persia, 1834–1848
 Muhammed Shah or Jan-Fishan Khan (died 1864), Afghan warlord
 Mohammad Ali Shah Qajar (1872–1925), Shah of Persia, 1907–1909
 Muhammad Shah Rukh (born 1926), former Pakistani field hockey player and cyclist
 Syed Muhammad Shah Noorani (born 1951), spiritual leader of the Noorbakshi Order of Sufism

Places 
 Mohammad Shah-e Olya, village in Naqadeh County, West Azerbaijan Province, Iran
 Mohammad Shah-e Sofla, village in Naqadeh County, West Azerbaijan Province, Iran

See also 
 Shah Muhammad (disambiguation)
 Sultan Muhammad Shah (disambiguation)